The 1967 USC Trojans football team represented the University of Southern California (USC) in the 1967 NCAA University Division football season. In their eighth year under head coach John McKay, the Trojans compiled a 10–1 record (6–1 against conference opponents), won the Athletic Association of Western Universities (AAWU or Pac-8) championship, and outscored their opponents by a combined total of 258 to 87. The team was ranked #1 in the final AP and Coaches Polls.

Steve Sogge led the team in passing, completing 75 of 151 passes for 1,032 yards with seven touchdowns and seven interceptions.  O. J. Simpson led the team in rushing with 291 carries for 1,543 yards and 13 touchdowns. Earl McCullouch led the team in receiving with 30 catches for 540 yards and five touchdowns. Simpson won the Walter Camp Award.

Robert Kardashian is said to have met OJ Simpson while serving as a water boy for the team. The relationship would later culminate in Kardashian being a part of the Dream Team in the O. J. Simpson murder case.

Schedule

Personnel

Game summaries

Washington
OJ Simpson 30 rushes, 235 yards

UCLA

The University of California at Los Angeles, 7-0-1 and ranked Number 1, with senior quarterback Gary Beban as a Heisman Trophy candidate, played the University of Southern California, 8-1 and ranked Number 4, with junior running back O. J. Simpson as a Heisman candidate. This game is widely regarded as the signature game in the UCLA–USC rivalry and the Trojans won the game by a score of 21-20.

1967 Trojans in the NFL
 O. J. Simpson
 Ron Yary

Awards and honors
O. J. Simpson (Junior), Running back, Walter Camp Award
Ron Yary (Senior), Tackle, Outland Trophy

References

USC
USC Trojans football seasons
College football national champions
Pac-12 Conference football champion seasons
Rose Bowl champion seasons
USC Trojans football